Clinton Calabrese (born March 4, 1986) is an American Democratic Party politician who has represented the 36th Legislative District in the New Jersey General Assembly since February 10, 2018, when he was sworn in to replace Marlene Caride, who resigned from office after being nominated to serve as head of the New Jersey Department of Banking and Insurance. Calabrese had served on the Board of Education of the Cliffside Park School District. He has been the Assembly's Deputy Whip since 2022.

Background 
A resident of Cliffside Park, Calabrese graduated from Don Bosco Preparatory High School in 2004, attended Saint Joseph's University in Philadelphia where he earned a bachelor's degree in business administration, and New York University, where he received a master's degree in real estate finance. Calabrese had been an analyst for Deutsche Bank and works as a principal for Alkova Companies, a real estate investment firm. Calabrese is the son of Gerald Calabrese Jr., the chairman of the Cliffside Park Democratic Party, and the grandson of Gerald Calabrese, a former professional basketball player who served for 50 years as mayor of Cliffside Park.

New Jersey Assembly 
In December 2017, Marlene Caride was nominated by incoming governor Phil Murphy to head the New Jersey Department of Banking and Insurance, a cabinet-level position, and resigned from office in January 2018. After being chosen by Democratic county committee members from Bergen County and Passaic County to fill the vacancy, Calabrese was sworn in to office on February 8, 2018, to succeed Caride. When he first took office at 31-years-old, Calabrese was the youngest serving member in the General Assembly.

Committees 
Committee assignments for the current session are:
Oversight, Reform and Federal Relations, Vice-Chair
Telecommunications and Utilities, Vice-Chair

District 36
Each of the 40 districts in the New Jersey Legislature has one representative in the New Jersey Senate and two members in the New Jersey General Assembly. The representatives from the 36th District for the 2022—23 Legislative Session are:
Senator Paul Sarlo (D)
Assemblyman Clinton Calabrese (D)
Assemblyman Gary Schaer (D)

Legislation 
In the 2018–2019 legislative session, Calabrese was primary sponsor on the following bills signed into law:

 A-4031 Requires display of identifying information on rear of school bus so public may report bus driver misconduct.
 A-4229 Applies Meadowlands regional hotel use assessment to all municipalities that participate in Meadowlands tax sharing program. 
 A-4707 Directs Department of Agriculture to establish public awareness campaign for food waste.

References

External links
Legislative webpage

Living people
Don Bosco Preparatory High School alumni
Democratic Party members of the New Jersey General Assembly
New York University alumni
People from Cliffside Park, New Jersey
Politicians from Bergen County, New Jersey
Saint Joseph's University alumni
21st-century American politicians
1986 births